The Great Britain national American football team, known as the GB Lions represents the UK in international gridiron. It is controlled by the British American Football Association.

Men's Senior Team

History
The Men's Senior GB Lions played their first game against France in 1985 at Stompond Lane. 2,000 attendees watched GB claim a 7–0 win thanks to a Victor Ebubedike touchdown. In 1986 and 1987, the Lions defeated the Netherlands and France over two legs each to qualify for the 1987 European Championship.

At their first major tournament, the Lions were defeated by Italy and Finland on their way to a 4th-place finish.

In 1989, they defeated France on the way to qualifying to their second consecutive championship. They defeated hosts Germany comprehensively in the semi-final thanks to Victor Ebubedike, Trevor Carthy and Allan Brown, who scored two touchdowns each in a 38–6 victory. The Terry Smith-led Lions met Finland in the final and got revenge for the 1987 defeat by shutting their rivals out in a 26–0 victory to claim their first European championship.

In 1991, the Lions, led by London Monarchs assistant Ray Willsey returned to defend their championship in Helsinki. After defeating the Netherlands 46–3 in the semi-final, they again met Finland in the Olympic Stadium and won 14–3 to claim back to back championships. 9 Lions; Tournament MVP Jason Elliott, Barry Driver, Mark Webb, Jo Richardson, Colin Nash, Paul Roberts, Warren Billingham, Gary Mills and Bola Ayiede.

In 1993, BAFA withdrew from the EFL and as such the Lions could not defend their title at the 1993 European Championships in Italy. In preparation for the 1995 European Championships in Austria, they defeated Ireland, but after Germany sensationally withdrew from the tournament, the Lions were hastily scheduled to play Ukraine away and potentially two further games in Austria within the space of eight days. Unable to handle the logistics, the Lions pulled out of the 1995 championships.

In 1997, the Lions returned to European competition, defeating Spain in Estadio La Peineta to qualify for the European Championships. In the semi-final, they lost 14–7 to Finland, and were defeated 24-6 by Finland in the third/fourth place playoff.

After the 1999 European Championships were suspended, the Lions were invited to take part in the inaugural IFAF World Championship but declined the offer. Ahead of the 2000 European Championship, head coach Riq Ayub resigned, and the Lions were again defeated by Finland.

In 2001, the Lions defeated Spain to qualify for the European Championships, where they expected to receive a semi-final bye after the disqualification of Germany. However, following a successful appeal, Germany were reinstated into the tournament and would face the Lions in the semi-final. Unable to fulfil the fixture at such short notice, the Lions were expelled from the tournament.

Following a reformatting of the European Championships, the 2005 Championship saw nations divided into three pools. In 2004, The Lions were placed in Pool B, and defeated Russia, Spain and France to win their pool, and qualify for Pool A of the championship. The Lions were defeated by the visiting Centre Colonels from Kentucky at Crystal Palace National Sports Centre, and were shut out by the one-seeded German team in the semi-final. In the bronze medal match, they were defeated by Finland 34–12.

In 2009, the Lions were defeated in a friendly by Australia but defeated reigning European champions Sweden in their next game. In the 2010 European Championships, the Lions were defeated by France, Sweden and Finland, scoring only 11 points on their way to a 6th-place finish. The Lions finished 3rd in the Group B Qualification tournament in Milan in 2013 and therefore did qualify to compete in the 2014 Championships.

European Championship Record

Personnel

Staff

Roster

GB Students

History
GB Students were founded in 1993 as a BCAFL "Allstars" team, coached by Damian Bayford from the University of Leeds. They were renamed the Bulldogs in the mid-1990s and mostly played touring teams.

After falling under the remit of BUCS in 2008, the governing body refused to sanction entry into the 2014 FISU World Championships.

Due to financial limitations and administrative errors, blamed on both BAFA and BUCS, it was announced there would be no GB Students team at the 2016 World Championships in Mexico, which resulted in the resignation of head coach, Wayne Hill.

Personnel

Staff

Roster

Under-19 Team

The Great Britain U-19 American Football team represent the nation in international competition of youth American Football.

Personnel

Staff

Roster

Women's team

The Great Britain Women's Team were founded in 2012 and represent the nation in Women's American football. In the 2015 European Championships, the team finished as runners-up, losing to Finland 50–12, their first ever defeat, in the final.

Personnel

Staff

Roster

Flag Football

BAFA also runs three flag football teams for men, women and under-19s.

Men's Senior Flag Team

Personnel

Staff

Roster

References

External links

American football in the United Kingdom
Men's national American football teams
American football
1985 establishments in the United Kingdom
American football teams established in 1985